Heterorhabditis is a genus of nematodes belonging to the order Rhabditida. All species of this genus are obligate parasites of insects, and some are used as biological control agents for the control of pest insects.

Heterorhabditis nematodes are hosts for the Photorhabdus bacterial symbiont.

Species
The recognized species in this genus are:
 Heterorhabditis amazonensis Andaló, Nguyen & Moino, 2007
 Heterorhabditis bacteriophora Poinar, 1976
 Heterorhabditis baujardi Phan, Subbotin, Nguyen & Moens, 2003
 Heterorhabditis downesi Stock, Griffin & Burnell, 2002
 Heterorhabditis floridensis Nguyen, Gozel, Koppenhöfer & Adams, 2006
 Heterorhabditis georgiana Nguyen, Shapiro-Ilan and Mbata, 2008
 Heterorhabditis heliothidis (Khan, Brooks & Hirschmann, 1976)
 Heterorhabditis indica Poinar, Karunakar & David, 1992
 Heterorhabditis marelatus Liu & Berry, 1996
 Heterorhabditis megidis Poinar, Jackson & Klein, 1987
 Heterorhabditis mexicana Nguyen, Shapiro-Ilan, Stuart, McCoy, James & Adams, 2004
 Heterorhabditis safricana Malan, Nguyen, de Waal and Tiedt, 2008
 Heterorhabditis taysearae Shamseldean, El-Sooud, Abd-Elgawad & Saleh, 1996
 Heterorhabditis zealandica Poinar, 1990

References

External links 
Entomopathogenic nematodes on the UF / IFAS Featured Creatures website.

Rhabditida genera
Parasites of insects
Biological control agents of pest insects
Taxa named by George Poinar Jr.